The Land Tortoise was a military transport ship built for service on Lake George, New York during the French and Indian War.  The vessel, a radeau (raft), was built in 1758, and was intentionally sunk later that year with the intention of raising her for use in 1759.  This did not happen, and the sunken vessel was discovered in 1990.  Its site is a National Historic Landmark and a state-protected underwater preserve.  It is believed to be the oldest intact warship in North America, and is the only surviving ship of its type.  The site is accessible to the diving public with advanced diving skills.

Description and history
The Land Tortoise was built in 1758, as part of a British effort to regain control of Lake George after the loss of Fort William Henry at the south end of the lake in 1757.  She was built by provincial militia forces under the direction of Captain Samuel Cobb of Falmouth, now Portland, Maine. She was built in just over a month, launched, tested ("rowed well with 26 oars") and then two days later intentionally sunk by adding ballast with plans to re-float her in the spring of 1759.  The location where she was sunk was too deep for recovery, and a new radeau, the Invincible, was built in 1759.

It has no keel, and was fitted with seven cannon ports. She was discovered in 1990, and was researched by a team of amateur divers guided by a professional archaeologist for four years. The site was listed on the National Register of Historic Places in 1995, and was designated a National Historic Landmark in 1998. The official National Historic Landmark plaque is located at the intersection of Beach Rd. and Fort George Rd (at the south end of Lake George).

References

Further reading
Register of the officers and members of the Society of Colonial Wars in the State of Maine. Together with Samuel Cobb's Journal. Marks Printing House. Portland, Maine 1905
Report on the 1994 installation of the Land Tortoise Radeau, Lake George, New York
The radeau Land Tortoise, North America's oldest intact warship : a learning book about a French & Indian War vessel
In search of Lake George's colonial warships (VHS, 1991)

External links
 All Over Albany Archive: The Lost Radeau: a shipwreck in Lake George
 

Buildings and structures in Warren County, New York
National Historic Landmarks in New York (state)
Shipwrecks on the National Register of Historic Places in New York (state)
Archaeological sites on the National Register of Historic Places in New York (state)
Shipwrecks of New York (state)
Shipwrecks in lakes
Maritime incidents in 1758
National Register of Historic Places in Warren County, New York
1758 ships
Ships built in New York (state)
Wreck diving sites in the United States